Renê Carmo Kreuz Weber (16 July 1961 – 16 December 2020) was a Brazilian football player and manager.

Biography
Between 2004 and 2005, Weber managed the Brazilian national under-20 team, which finished in third place at the 2005 FIFA World Youth Championship.

Weber died from complications brought on by COVID-19 in Rio de Janeiro on 16 December 2020, at the age of 59 during the COVID-19 pandemic in Brazil.

References

External links 
 

1961 births
2020 deaths
Deaths from the COVID-19 pandemic in Rio de Janeiro (state)
Sportspeople from Rio Grande do Sul
Brazilian footballers
Brazilian football managers
Association football midfielders
Brazil international footballers
Campeonato Brasileiro Série A players
Campeonato Brasileiro Série B players
Primeira Liga players
Brazilian expatriate footballers
Brazilian expatriate sportspeople in Portugal
Brazilian expatriate sportspeople in Brunei
Expatriate footballers in Portugal
Expatriate football managers in Brunei
Brazilian people of German descent
Sport Club Internacional players
Fluminense FC players
Vitória S.C. players
America Football Club (RJ) players
America Football Club (RJ) managers
Sporting Cristal managers
Brazil national under-20 football team managers
Al Shabab Al Arabi Club managers
Criciúma Esporte Clube managers
Vila Nova Futebol Clube managers
Sociedade Esportiva e Recreativa Caxias do Sul managers
Figueirense FC managers
Associação Atlética Anapolina managers
Nova Iguaçu Futebol Clube managers
DPMM FC managers